Christophe Keckeis (18 April 1945 – 1 May 2020) was a Swiss Lieutenant-General. He headed the Swiss Army as "Chief of the General Staff" (2003) and then as "Chief of the Armed Forces" (2004–2007). He retired on 31 December 2007.
 On 24 March 1977, two Mirage III (J-2003 and J-2310) collided during a formation flight over the Payerne airfield. All parties involved survived the collision, including the then commander-in-chief of the Fliegerstaffel 17, Christophe Keckeis.

Decorations and awards

References

External links

1945 births
2020 deaths
People from Neuchâtel
University of Lausanne alumni
Swiss military officers
Swiss Air Force personnel